Mahana may refer to:

Places
Mahana, List of schools in the Tasman District
Mahana, site of Kokia cookei trees, northeast of Puu Nana
Mahana Airport, airport serving Touba, Côte d'Ivoire
Mahana Beach, located near South Point, in the Kaʻū district of the island of Hawaiʻi 
Mahana, Narayanganj, Dhaka Div, Bangladesh
Mahana, Administrative divisions of French Polynesia

People
Nur Mahana, Syrian singer
Satish Mahana (born 1960), Indian politicians belonging to BJP

Film
Mahana (film), 2016 New Zealand drama film written and directed by Lee Tamahori